Gong Qianyun (born 11 March 1985) is a Chinese born Singaporean chess player. She was awarded the title of Woman Grandmaster (WGM) by FIDE in 2018.

Chess career
Gong finished fourth in the 2001 Women's Chinese Chess Championship. She won the Singaporean women's championships of 2012, 2015, 2016, 2017 and 2018.

Gong played on board four on the Chinese women's team — the only women's team present — at the World Team Chess Championship held in Beersheba, Israel in 2005. The following year, she won the Women's World University Chess Championship in Lagos, Nigeria with a score of 7/9 points, contributing to China's team gold medal.

After a series of defeat, Gong left the Chinese teams in 2007 and moved to Hong Kong where she taught chess there.

In 2009, Gong moved to Singapore to work as a chess coach.

In 2014, Gong transferred to the Singapore Chess Federation and started to represent Singapore. In the same year, she played for the Singaporean team on board three in the open section of the 41st Chess Olympiad and earned a norm for the title Woman Grandmaster thanks to a performance rating of 2412. In June 2018, Gong earned her final WGM norm at the QCD Prof Lim Kok Ann Invitational tournament. In December, she tied with Padmini Rout for first place in the Asian Women's Continental Championship in Makati, Philippines, scoring 7/9 points. Gong took the silver medal on tiebreak score.

Gong plays for Qingdao Yucai chess club in the China Chess League (CCL).

Personal life 
Gong is married with 2 children.

References

External links
 
 
  (2001–2006)
 
 

1985 births
Living people
Chess woman grandmasters
Chinese female chess players
Singaporean chess players
Chess players from Guangdong
People from Shaoguan
Chinese emigrants to Singapore
Singaporean sportspeople of Chinese descent
Competitors at the 2021 Southeast Asian Games
Southeast Asian Games competitors for Singapore